Al Manar National School (commonly known as Al-Manar College or simply as Al-Manar),  is a national school in Handessa, Kandy. It was founded 15 September 1892. It is one of the oldest Muslim school established in Sri Lanka.

History
The Al Manar National School was founded in 1892 as Pethiyagoda Tamil School in Thalawathura. It was later moved to Boowelikada in 1929 and named as Ketakumbura Tamil school, then in 1964 it was moved to its current location in Ambarapola. At that time the school was called Al Manar Maha Vidyalaya and later on in 1999 it was renamed Al Manar Central College (National School).

Factors influencing establishment
During the period of British Colonial regime there were only missionary schools far from villages to educate the children and only elite classes were  able to educate their children so for the poor and middle class there were no proper schools  so the community leaders decided to request to higher authorities to establish a school in compliance with this school was established.

125 years anniversary 
For the school's 125th anniversary the Al Manar management board, SDC, OBA and OGA joined together and planned a 125-year celebration walk.

Houses 
The students are divided into six houses, which are split by gender. The houses, led by house captains, compete in all major games to win the inter-house games. The houses are:
Boys
 Akbar colour : Blue 
 Ikbal colour : Yellow 
 Jinna colour : Green 
Girls
 Jesmine colour : Yellow 
 Lotus colour : Purple 
 Orchid colour : Pink

Officials

Gallery

References

External links
Official Almanar National School Handessa Facebook Page
Schools Online
School Directory
School Directory

Educational institutions established in 1892
Schools in Kandy
National schools in Sri Lanka
1892 establishments in Ceylon